Haverfordwest was a parliamentary constituency. It returned one Member of Parliament (MP) to the House of Commons of the Parliament of the United Kingdom, elected by the first past the post system.

History
The constituency was enfranchised in 1545, as the second borough constituency in the historic county of Pembrokeshire. In the previous election of 1542, the first at which Wales is known to have sent members to the Parliament of England, this borough was one of the ancient boroughs contributing to the wages and being in some sense represented by the member for Pembroke.

During the eighteenth century, Haverfordwest was considered to be little more than a pocket borough for the Philipps family of Picton Castle.

From 1832 to 1885, it was a district of boroughs constituency, consisting of the three boroughs of Haverfordwest, Fishguard and Narberth.

The constituency was abolished for the 1885 general election, and merged into the newly created constituency of Pembroke and Haverfordwest.

Members of Parliament

1543–1660

1660–1885

Election results

Elections in the 1830s

Elections in the 1840s

Elections in the 1850s

Elections in the 1860s

Elections in the 1870s
Edwardes was appointed a Groom in Waiting, requiring a by-election.

The election was declared void on petition, causing a by-election, after a separate potential candidate, Mr Davis, had been refused his nomination by the local sheriff without a deposit for security of costs. However, in the resulting by-election, Davis did not stand and Edwardes was re-elected.

Elections in the 1880s

Edwardes was appointed Comptroller of the Household, requiring a by-election.

References

Sources

Historic parliamentary constituencies in South Wales
Constituencies of the Parliament of the United Kingdom disestablished in 1885